Real Insurance Company of Malawi Limited, commonly referred to as Real Insurance, is an insurance company based in Blantyre, Malawi.

Overview 
Real Insurance is the only listed insurance company on the Malawi Stock Exchange and offers a wide range of insurance products to both corporate and individual clients through its branch network across Malawi.

Real Insurance is the oldest insurance company in Malawi.

History 
Real Insurance Company of Malawi started operating in 1959 as Royal Insurance Company of Malawi, as a branch of UK based Royal Insurance. Following the merger of Royal Insurance and Sun Alliance in 1996, the business became part of the RSA Insurance Group. In 2000, the RSA Insurance Group decided to reorganize its Africa business. This reorganization led to incorporation of the subsidiary and transfer of its ownership to Kenyan-based REAL Insurance Company of Kenya Limited.

29 September 2008, Real Insurance Company of Malawi's shares started trading on the MSE after a successful IPO that was over-subscribed by 300%.

The company became a member of the British-American Investments Company in 2014 after the successful acquisition of its parent company through a deal that was valued at approximately US$16 million.

Ownership 
The shares of the stock of Real Insurance are traded on the Malawi Stock Exchange, under the symbol: REAL. The shareholding in the company's stock is as follows:

Britam 

Real Insurance Company of Malawi Limited is a member of the British-American Investments Company (Britam) Group, an East African financial services group, with headquarters in Nairobi, Kenya and listed on the Nairobi Securities Exchange. Britam has operational subsidiaries in seven Africa countries with investments ranging from insurance, real estate, asset management and banking.

Governance 
Real Insurance is governed by a six-person Board of Directors with Thomas O. B. Kanyuka as the chairman and Grant Mwenechanya as the CEO.

See also 
 British-American Investments Company
 Malawi Stock Exchange

References

External links 
 British-American Investments Company Homepage
 Real Insurance Company of Malawi Homepage
 Malawi Stock Exchange

Insurance companies of Malawi
Financial services companies established in 1959
1959 establishments in Nyasaland
Companies listed on Malawi Stock Exchange